Hiroshi Kisanuki (木佐貫 洋, born May 17, 1980) is a former Japanese professional baseball pitcher for the Hokkaido Nippon-Ham Fighters in Japan's Nippon Professional Baseball. He previously played for the Yomiuri Giants from 2003 to 2009. He won the Central League Rookie of the Year Award in 2003.

External links

NPB.com

1980 births
Living people
Baseball people from Kagoshima Prefecture
Asia University (Japan) alumni
Japanese expatriate baseball players in the Dominican Republic
Nippon Professional Baseball pitchers
Yomiuri Giants players
Orix Buffaloes players
Hokkaido Nippon-Ham Fighters players
Nippon Professional Baseball Rookie of the Year Award winners
Japanese baseball coaches
Nippon Professional Baseball coaches
Gigantes del Cibao players